Greenbush, New York may refer to a few places in the U.S. state of New York:

In Rensselaer County:
 Greenbush, Rensselaer County, New York, a former town which was divided in 1855 into

 East Greenbush, New York, a town
 East Greenbush (CDP), New York, a hamlet within the town
 North Greenbush, New York, a town
 The Village of Greenbush, which in 1897 became the City of Rensselaer

In Rockland County:
 Greenbush, Rockland County, New York, a former name for the hamlet of Blauvelt

In Schoharie County:
 Greenbush, Schoharie County, New York, a small settlement in the town of Cobleskill